Jean is a small commercial town in Clark County, Nevada, United States, located approximately  north of the Nevada–California state line along Interstate 15. There are no residents of Jean, but many people in nearby communities such as Primm and Sandy Valley have Jean listed in their mailing address because it is the location of the main post office for the 89019 ZIP code.

The area is mostly commercial, with the exception of the post office and the courthouse, with commercial outlets such as Terrible's Hotel & Casino, the Jean Sport Aviation Center (used for activities like skydiving), Jean Conservation Camp (a minimum-security, all female Nevada Department of Corrections facility established in 1987) and a Nevada Highway Patrol (NHP) substation. The Nevada Landing Hotel and Casino was also located here but it was demolished in April 2008 and the sign was removed in 2010. The Jean Post Office is located on Las Vegas Boulevard in Jean. The Goodsprings Township Courthouse is also located in Jean.

History

The town was originally named Goodsprings Junction. On June 28, 1905, postmaster George Arthur Fayle renamed it Jean in honor of his wife. He also built the Pioneer Saloon in Goodsprings.

Pop's Oasis Casino was the first casino in Jean. The Oasis closed in 1988.  Chips and tokens from Pop's Oasis were poured into the foundation of the Nevada Landing.  When the Nevada Landing was leveled in May 2008 these chips and tokens, some embedded in concrete, were found by collectors.

The welcome center was moved to Primm in early 2000. The original welcome center was converted to a Nevada Highway Patrol substation in 2004.

The median between the Nevada Landing Hotel and Casino and the Gold Strike Hotel and Gambling Hall was the scene of the worst single-vehicle accident in Southern Nevada history at that time, when a van with 13 people flipped over and eight people were killed. The accident occurred in March 2000.

The Nevada Landing Casino closed in March 2007. The Gold Strike remained open and was renamed as Terrible's in 2018.

The world's largest Chevron gas station, with 96 pumps, opened across from the former site of the Nevada Landing in 2018.

In the early 1970s, the Southern Nevada Timing Association, a Las Vegas car club, operated a 1/4 mile National Hot Rod Association sanctioned dragstrip on the old L.A. highway just south of town. This strip was opened due to the fact that the Stardust raceway had closed and there was no place to race legally. The local Lions Club and the Clark County Sheriff's Department also sanctioned drag racing here.

The lengths of guard rail required by NHRA were installed on each side and a small observation tower was built. There were no timing or starting lights, all starts were by a flagger. The finish line was viewed by a club member who would go up on the track after the cars went by and stand in the winner's lane to show who won. His decision was final.

Races were run every weekend unless the weather proved dangerous to racers. Races were even run at night with the rental of a huge arc type spotlight that was projected down the track from the starting line. 
The track was closed when the Las Vegas Speedrome opened across from Nellis Air Force Base. That track is now named The Strip at Las Vegas.

Geography
Jean is located on a mountain pass, Jean Pass (south), west of the Jean Dry Lake basin. Sheep Mountain borders Jean to the east, southeast of Jean Dry Lake. Northwest of the pass lies the southeast foothills of the Bird Spring Range.

Installation venue
The area around Jean has been the site of several installation art exhibits, including Study for An End of the World, No. 2 in 1962 when Jean Tinguely and Niki de Saint Phalle blew up sculptures.  In 1968, Michael Heizer created a zig-zag trench installation.  In 2016 Ugo Rondinone built Seven Magic Mountains.

See also

 Jean Pass (north)

References

External links

 
1904 establishments in Nevada
Ivanpah Valley
Populated places established in 1904
Populated places in the Mojave Desert
Unincorporated communities in Clark County, Nevada